Elena Sangro (born Maria Antonietta Bartoli Avveduti, 5 September 1897 – 26 January 1969) was an Italian actress.

Selected filmography
 The Crusaders (1918)
 Fabiola (1918)
 Samson (1923)
 Emperor Maciste (1924)
 Pleasure Train (1924)
 Quo Vadis? (1924)
 Maciste in the Lion's Cage (1926)
 Goodbye Youth (1927)
 Villa Falconieri (1928)
 L'abito nero da sposa (1945)
 The Young Caruso (1951)

Bibliography
 Vacche, Angela Dalle. Diva: Defiance and Passion in Early Italian Cinema. University of Texas Press, 2008.

References

External links

1897 births
1969 deaths
Italian film actresses
Italian silent film actresses
People from Vasto
People of Abruzzese descent
20th-century Italian actresses